Pedobacter alluvionis is a Gram-negative, rod-shaped, non-spore-forming eubacterial species. Its type strain is NWER-II11T (=DSM 19624T =LMG 24258T).

References

Further reading
Whitman, William B., et al., eds. Bergey's manual® of systematic bacteriology. Vol. 5. Springer, 2012.
Fulthorpe, Roberta R., et al. "Distantly sampled soils carry few species in common." The ISME Journal 2.9 (2008): 901–910.

External links

LPSN
Type strain of Pedobacter alluvionis at BacDive -  the Bacterial Diversity Metadatabase

Sphingobacteriia
Bacteria described in 2009